is a subway station on the Tokyo Metro Marunouchi Line in Shinjuku, Tokyo, Japan, operated by the Tokyo subway operator Tokyo Metro. It is numbered "M-10".

Lines
Shinjuku-gyoemmae Station is served by the Tokyo Metro Marunouchi Line.

Platforms
The station consists of two side platforms serving two tracks.

History
Shinjuku-gyoemmae Station opened on 15 March 1959.

The station facilities were inherited by Tokyo Metro after the privatization of the Teito Rapid Transit Authority (TRTA) in 2004.

Surrounding area
 Shinjuku Gyoen National Garden

References

External links

  

Stations of Tokyo Metro
Tokyo Metro Marunouchi Line
Railway stations in Tokyo
Buildings and structures in Shinjuku
Railway stations in Japan opened in 1959